The Cybernetic Culture Research Unit (CCRU) was an experimental cultural theorist collective formed in late 1995 at Warwick University, England and gradually separated from academia until it dissolved in 2003. It garnered reputation for its idiosyncratic and surreal "theory-fiction" which incorporated cyberpunk and Gothic horror, and its work has since had an online cult following related to the rise in popularity of accelerationism. Warwick University maintains that the CCRU was never a sanctioned academic project, with some faculty going so far as to assert that the CCRU "has never existed". The CCRU are strongly associated with their former leading members, Sadie Plant, Mark Fisher and Nick Land.

Overview
The CCRU's work is characterized by loose, abstract theoretical writing combining elements of cyberpunk and Gothic horror with critical theory, esotericism, numerology and demonology, which often interplay in their deployment of occult systems and surreal narratives. One of the CCRU's predominant ideas is hyperstition, which Nick Land referred to as "the experimental (techno-)science of self-fulfilling prophecies" where by means of esoteric cybernetic principles, certain ideas and beliefs that are initially incomprehensible (akin to superstitions) can covertly circulate through reality and establish cultural feedback loops that then drastically meld society, which they also referred to in total as "cultural production". The CCRU's esoteric numerological cybernetic system for comprehending hyperstition, the Numogram, often appears in their writings alongside its circulatory zones and their respective demons.
 
In addition to drawing inspiration from Gilles Deleuze and Félix Guattari's Anti-Oedipus and A Thousand Plateaus, to which references can be found in the CCRU's writings, the collective drew inspiration from writers including H. P. Lovecraft, William Gibson, J. G. Ballard, Octavia Butler, William S. Burroughs, Carl Jung and various other sources related to critical theory, science fiction, anthropology and nanotechnology.

History

1993–1996
Theorist and researcher Sadie Plant, working in the University of Warwick, formed the collective around 1993–1994 as a cyberfeminist research group which initially only involved itself in studies and did not publish texts. Eventually, as she left her academic post, student and philosopher Nick Land who had at the time recently published his monograph The Thirst for Annihilation became the driving force in determining its methods and ideas. Other major contributors included Kodwo Eshun, Iain Hamilton Grant and Stephen Metcalf, as well as other colleagues whose research were inspired by emerging nihilist, psychoanalytic and materialist theory.

The connections made leading up to the formation of the CCRU and during its tenure eventually lead to the Virtual Futures conferences. The conferences, organised from 1994–96, were initially founded by Joan Broadhurst, Dan O’Hara, Otto Imken, Eric Cassidy, and postgraduate students under the aegis of the Warwick Centre for Research in Philosophy and Literature.

Stephen Metcalf was a central player in CCRU's creation. His essay "Autogeddon" is included in the 1998 Virtual Futures book published by Routledge, and in 1996, Metcalf translated, edited and published a collection of texts by Friedrich Nietzsche, Hammer of the Gods: Apocalyptic Texts for the Criminally Insane, that reflected and influenced how Nietzsche was being read by those who formed the CCRU at the time.

1997–2003
The CCRU drastically took on new forms and became increasingly experimental under the direction of Land. According to Robin Mackay, by around 1998, "the CCRU became quasi-cultish, quasi-religious". Mackay mentions having "left before it descended into sheer madness", with Iain Hamilton Grant asserting that the later excesses drove several members into mental breakdown. The collective became increasingly unorthodox in its work, with its output including writing, performance events, music and collaborative art, and exploring post-structuralism, cybernetics, science fiction, rave culture, and occult studies. The CCRU's written output was largely self-published in zines such as Collapse and Abstract Culture, and many of these writings are maintained online on the website for the CCRU.

Land's antisocial behavior, reliance on amphetamines, and increasingly experimental writing at this time led academics and contemporaries to distance themselves from him, until he eventually left his academic post. As a consequence, the CCRU could no longer use space at, or claim affiliation with Warwick University. CCRU continued to operate from a flat in Leamington Spa up until its disestablishment in 2003.

Members and affiliates
Following the departure of Plant whereupon the University of Warwick began to deny any relationship to the group, some of the CCRU's members have had an ongoing subcultural impact.

Those who were affiliated with the CCRU during and after its time as part of the University of Warwick Philosophy department include philosophers Stephen Metcalf, Iain Hamilton Grant, Ray Brassier and Reza Negarestani; cultural theorists Mark Fisher and Kodwo Eshun; publisher and philosopher Robin Mackay; digital media theorists Luciana Parisi and Matthew Fuller; electronic music artist and Hyperdub label head Steve Goodman, a.k.a. Kode9; writer and theorist Anna Greenspan; sound theorist Angus Carlyle; novelist Hari Kunzru; and artists Jake and Dinos Chapman, among others.

Land and the CCRU collaborated frequently with the experimental art collective  (Maggie Roberts and Ranu Mukherjee), notably on Syzygy, a month-long multidisciplinary residency at Beaconsfield Contemporary Art gallery in South London, 1999, and on  Cyberpositive (London: Cabinet, 1995), a set of texts which demonstrated CCRU's approaches.

Legacy and controversy
Urbanomic and Time Spiral Press published a collection of texts by the CCRU entitled CCRU: Writings 1997-2003 in 2015, which garnered high reception and renewed interest in the collective's writings, mythology and overall approach to speculative fiction and philosophy. None of the work is attributed, but largely appears to be written by Land or under his strong influence, and although it states in the collection that it is a complete collection, this does not appear to be accurate. 

The role played by Land, Plant, and the CCRU in the development of the fringe philosophy accelerationism is profound, and contemporary debates around it have concerned the viability and utility of Land's ideas with the CCRU. Accelerationism as it was deployed by CCRU is distinct from the term more frequently associated with Nick Srnicek and Alex Williams' text "Manifesto for an Accelerationist Politics". Land himself makes this distinction clear in his commentary on the manifesto, but Land's version of accelerationism which he developed in the early 2010s notoriously incorporates esoteric and anti-egalitarian views, and since late 2016 has been increasingly recognized as an inspiration for the alt-right.

American electronic musician Oneohtrix Point Never, who credited the CCRU's writings as an influence on his 2018 song "Black Snow" from his album Age Of, initially received negative reception after acknowledging their influence. The artist later indicated that he was not interested in the alt-right transition that Land made, which happened after Land's involvement in the CCRU.

Further reading 
The doctoral theses of several CCRU members and associates, submitted to Warwick University in the late 1990s and early 2000s, are available online and provide another perspective on the research of the CCRU.

 Alien Theory: The Decline of Materialism in the Name of Matter by Ray Brassier
 Capitalism's Transcendental Time Machine by Anna Greenspan
 Flatline Constructs: Gothic Materialism and Cybernetic Theory-Fiction by Mark Fisher
 Touch-Sensitive: Cybernetic Images and Replicant Bodies in the Post-Industrial Age by Suzanne Livingston
 Turbulence: A Cartography of Postmodern Violence by Steve Goodman

See also
Accelerationism
Speculative realism

References

Accelerationism
Collectives
Critical theory
Cultural studies
Cyberpunk culture
Esotericists
Historical schools